This is a list of flag bearers who have represented China at the Olympics.

Flag bearers carry the national flag of their country at the opening ceremony of the Olympic Games.

See also
China at the Olympics

References

China at the Olympics
China
Olympic flagbearers